Harlan is an unincorporated community in Smith County, Kansas, United States.

History
Harlan was named for John C. Harlan, a pioneer settler.

A post office was opened in Harlan in the 1870s, and remained in operation until it was discontinued in 1995.

Education
Harlan is served by Smith Center USD 237 public school district.

Harlan High School was closed through school unification. The Harlan High School mascot was Cardinals.

References

Further reading

External links
 Smith County maps: Current, Historic, KDOT

Unincorporated communities in Smith County, Kansas
Unincorporated communities in Kansas